Nandi Firozpur or Nandi Ferozepur is a village of Saharanpur district, Uttar Pradesh, India. It is approximately ten kilometers from Saharanpur.

Religious sites
In this village, there are mostly temples and a big mosque.

References 
Villages in Saharanpur district